A gas-fired power plant or gas-fired power station or natural gas power plant is a thermal power station which burns natural gas to generate electricity. Natural gas power stations generate almost a quarter of world electricity and a significant part of global greenhouse gas emissions and thus climate change. However they can provide seasonal dispatchable generation to balance variable renewable energy where hydropower or interconnectors are not available.

Basic concepts: heat into mechanical energy into electrical energy

A gas-fired power plant is a type of fossil fuel power station in which chemical energy stored in natural gas, which is mainly methane, is converted successively into: thermal energy, mechanical energy and, finally, electrical energy. Although they cannot exceed the Carnot cycle limit for conversion of heat energy into useful work the excess heat may be used in cogeneration plants to heat buildings, produce hot water, or to heat materials on an industrial scale.

Plant types

Simple cycle gas-turbine
In a simple cycle gas-turbine, also known as open-cycle gas-turbine (OCGT), hot gas drives a gas turbine to generate electricity. This type of plant is relatively cheap to build and can start very quickly, but due to its lower efficiency is at most is only run for a few hours a day as a peaking power plant.

Combined cycle gas-turbine (CCGT) 

CCGT power plants consist of simple cycle gas-turbines which use the Brayton cycle, followed by a heat recovery steam generator and a steam turbine which use the Rankine cycle. The most common configuration is two gas-turbines supporting one steam turbine. They are more efficient than simple cycle plants and can achieve efficiencies up to 55% and dispatch times of around half an hour.

Reciprocating engine

Reciprocating internal combustion engines tend to be under 20MW, so much smaller than other types of natural gas-fired electricity generator, and are typically used for emergency power or to balance variable renewable energy such as wind and solar.

Greenhouse gas emissions
This is about half that of coal-fired power stations but much more than nuclear power plants and renewable energy. Life-cycle emissions of gas-fired power stations may be impacted by methane emissions such as from gas leaks.

Carbon capture
 very few power plants have carbon capture and storage or carbon capture and utilization.

Hydrogen

Gas-fired power plants can be modified to run on hydrogen and according to General Electric a more economically viable option than CCS would be to use more and more hydrogen in the gas turbine fuel. Hydrogen can at first be created from natural gas through steam reforming, or by heating to precipitate carbon, as a step towards a hydrogen economy, thus eventually reducing carbon emissions.

Economics

New plants
Sometimes a new battery storage power station together with solar power or wind power is cheaper in the long-term than building a new gas plant, as the gas plant risks becoming a stranded asset.

Existing plants
 a few gas-fired power plants are being retired because they are unable to stop and start quickly enough. However, despite the falling cost of variable renewable energy most existing gas-fired power plants remain profitable, especially in countries without a carbon price, due to their dispatchable generation and because shale gas and liquefied natural gas prices have fallen since they were built. Even in places with a carbon price, such as the EU, existing gas-fired power stations remain economically viable, partly due to increasing restrictions on coal-fired power because of its pollution.

Politics
Even when replacing coal power the decision to build a new plant may be controversial.

See also 
List of natural gas power stations

External links
 Global gas plant tracker by Global Energy Monitor

References

Natural gas-fired power stations
Greenhouse gas emissions
Hydrogen